"Nuthin' but a 'G' Thang" is a song by American rapper Dr. Dre, featuring fellow American rapper Snoop Doggy Dogg, on Dre's debut solo album, The Chronic (1992). As the album's first single it reached number 2 on the Billboard Hot 100 on March 20, 1993, behind "Informer" by Snow, outperformed The Chronics other singles, "Fuck wit Dre Day (And Everybody's Celebratin')", which peaked at number 8, and "Let Me Ride", which peaked at number 34. The single also reached number 1 on Billboards Hot R&B/Hip-Hop Singles & Tracks chart, and was a no 31 hit in the UK.  

The song was selected by the Rock and Roll Hall of Fame as one of the 500 songs that shaped rock and roll. XXL magazine named it the top hip-hop song of the decade. The song samples "I Want'a Do Something Freaky to You" by Leon Haywood. In June 1994, it was reissued in certain European countries.

Music video
The accompanying music video for "Nuthin' but a 'G' Thang", directed by Dr. Dre, depicts Dre coming into Long Beach, California to pick up Snoop and go to a block party. Mingling at the party, they perform the first verses with a barbecue cookout and a game of volleyball nearby. A female player's (Mercedes Ashley) bikini top is pulled down by "T-Dubb", an original member of the Long Beach rap group Foesum, exposing her breasts. For the next verses they go inside the house. A small sequence of events shows a snobbish female party-goer humiliated by being sprayed with shaken-up malt liquor. The video ends with Dre dropping Snoop off back at his house, with Snoop staggering up the driveway. The MTV edit censors nudity, drug paraphernalia, Warren G with a blunt, copyrighted logos, a Chicago White Sox ball cap, and screen text. Many artists appeared in video, including The D.O.C., Warren G, Daz Dillinger, Kurupt, RBX and Suga Free.

In popular culture
In the 2015 biopic Straight Outta Compton, the song is shown being improvised by Snoop Dogg (Lakeith Stanfield) and Dr. Dre (Corey Hawkins).

Accolades
"Nuthin' but a 'G' Thang" is listed in The Rock and Roll Hall of Fame's 500 Songs that Shaped Rock and Roll. It is Dre's only song on Rolling Stones list of the 500 Greatest Songs of All Time, ranked at number 419, not counting two other songs that feature Dre as a producer and on vocals, N.W.A's "Fuck tha Police" and Tupac's "California Love". Q magazine listed it as the 24th greatest hip hop song of all time and is featured in the game Grand Theft Auto San Andreas.  In September 2010 Pitchfork Media included it at number 3 on their Top 200 Tracks of the 90s.

Criticism
In 1998, CBS reported that Senator Sam Brownback (R-Kansas), who sought hearings in the Senate Commerce Science and Transportation Committee, said he was "concerned that the music industry is marketing its most violent and misogynist music to teens." The report added, "While industry executives assert that children are protected from this music, much evidence suggests that most hyper-violent albums are bought by children." Advisory labels were an outcome of the hearings.

Musically, the funk orientation in hip-hop is often linked to "Nuthin' but a 'G' Thang" but its roots were laid by another rap group, Above the Law. "Nuthin' But a G Thang echoes Above the Law's Never Missin' a Beat" [sic], according to a 2016 article in The Guardian. Both groups interpolated the signature funk grooves of Parliament-Funkadelic.

Track listing

 1992 CD singleImages for Dr. Dre – Nuthin' But A 'G' Thang
 "Nuthin' But a "G" Thang" (Radio Mix) – 3:56
 "Nuthin' But a "G" Thang" (LP Version) – 3:58
 "Nuthin' But a "G" Thang" (Instrumental) – 4:06
 "Nuthin' But a "G" Thang" (Club Mix) – 4:38
 "Nuthin' But a "G" Thang" (Vibe Instrumental) – 4:30
 "Nuthin' But a "G" Thang" (Freestyle Remix) – 4:11

 1994 CD single "Nuthin' But a "G" Thang" (Radio Mix) – 3:56
 "Let Me Ride" (Radio Mix) – 4:22
 "Nuthin' But a "G" Thang" (Club Mix) – 4:38
 "Let Me Ride" (Extended Club Mix) – 11:01

 1992 12" vinyl "Nuthin' But a "G" Thang" (Radio Mix) – 3:56
 "Nuthin' But a "G" Thang" (LP Version) – 3:58
 "Nuthin' But a "G" Thang" (Instrumental) – 4:06
 "A Nigga Witta Gun" – 3:56
 "Nuthin' But a "G" Thang" (Club Mix) – 4:38
 "Nuthin' But a "G" Thang" (Freestyle Remix) – 4:11

 1994 UK 12" vinyl "Let Me Ride" (Radio Mix) – 4:22
 "Let Me Ride" (Extended Club Mix) – 11:01
 "Nuthin' But a "G" Thang" (Freestyle Remix) – 4:11

 1994 US 12" vinyl'
 "Nuthin' But a "G" Thang" (Radio Mix) – 3:56
 "Nuthin' But a "G" Thang" (Red Eye Mix) – 4:25
 "Nuthin' But a "G" Thang" (Club Mix) – 4:38
 "Let Me Ride" (Radio Mix) – 4:22

Charts

Weekly charts

Year-end charts

Decade-end charts

Certifications

See also
List of number-one R&B singles of 1993 (U.S.)

References

External links

1992 songs
1992 singles
1993 singles
Dr. Dre songs
Snoop Dogg songs
Death Row Records singles
Interscope Records singles
G-funk songs
Songs about California
Song recordings produced by Dr. Dre
Songs written by Snoop Dogg
Songs written by The D.O.C.
Songs written by Leon Haywood
Songs written by Dr. Dre
Songs about drugs